Miller-Consolidated Pictures was a film production company.  Formed by John Miller in 1959, the company specialized in low-budget films.  The company also had many known names on its board, including exploitation film presenter Kroger Babb, who was in charge of marketing.

Selected filmography

 Date With Death (1959)
 The Amazing Transparent Man (1960)
 Beyond the Time Barrier (1960)

External links
 Turner Classic Movies: Beyond the Time Barrier.

Film production companies of the United States